Moqimabad may refer to:
 Moqimabad, Razavi Khorasan
 Moqimabad, Tehran